Joseph Emile M. Ouellette (July 23, 1908 – January 15, 1992) was a Canadian politician. He served in the Legislative Assembly of New Brunswick from 1970 to 1974 as member of the Progressive Conservative party.

References

1908 births
1992 deaths